Fleischman and Fleischmann are common family names which mean "butcher" in German. Fleišman is the Czech spelling. Other names which have the same meaning include Fleischer, Boucher, Metzger and Resnick. Names with similar or derivative meanings include Schechter and Schlechter, which mean "slaughterer".

Notable people with the name include:

Fleischmann 
 Aloys Fleischmann (1910–1992), Irish composer and musicologist
 Aloys Fleischmann (Senior) (1880–1964), German composer and organist, lived and died in Ireland
 Arthur Fleischmann (1896–1990), Slovak-born sculptor, pioneer of Perspex sculpture
 Bernhard Fleischmann (born 1975), Austrian musician, usually known as B. Fleischmann
 Chuck Fleischmann (born 1962), U.S. Representative from Tennessee
 Charles Louis Fleischmann (1835–1897), innovator who developed the commercial usage of yeast for baking bread
 Elisa Fleischmann (born 1985), Italian ski mountaineer
 Ernest Fleischmann (1924–2010), German-born American impresario
 Gisi Fleischmann (1894–1944), Zionist activist
 Jan Fleischmann, Czech ice hockey player
 Johann Anton Friedrich Fleischmann (1766–1798), German composer
 Julius Fleischmann (1871–1925), mayor of Cincinnati
 Mark Fleischmann (born 1972), British actor
 Martin Fleischmann (1927–2012), chemist best known for his work with Stanley Pons on cold fusion
 Miloslav Fleischmann, Czech ice hockey player
 Peter Fleischmann (1937–2021), German film director
 Robert Fleischman (born 1953), American musician
 Rudolf Fleischmann (1903–2002), physicist; also spelled as Rudolph Fleischmann
 Tomáš Fleischmann (born 1984), Czech professional ice hockey player with the Colorado Avalanche of the National Hockey League

Fleischman 
 Adam Fleischman (born 1969/1970), American restaurateur and founder of Umami Burger chain
 Albert Sydney Fleischman (1920–2010), American writer of detective stories, spy novels and under the pseudonym of Sid Fleischman of childhood and youth literature
  (1886–1973), first president of the Jewish National Fund (FNJ) of France
 Bill Fleischman (1939–2019), American sports journalist
  (1941–2010), French lawyer and writer
 Elizabeth Fleischman (1867–1905), American X-ray pioneer; first woman to die as a result of her work with X-rays
 Joan Michaël Fleischman (1707–1768), German-Dutch typographer
 Joel Fleischman, a fictional central character of the television series Northern Exposure
 Maxime Fleischman (born 1938), a Montreal dramatist, composer of several theatrical plays
 Paul Fleischman (born 1952), American children's author
 Sid Fleischman (1920–2010), children's book and film writer
  (1893–1979), Belgian journalist, radio presenter and writer
 Tom Fleischman (born 1951), American cinema mixer

Fleišman 
 Jiří Fleišman (born 1984), Czech football defender

See also
Fleishman

German-language surnames
Occupational surnames
Jewish surnames